Lynette Delgado is a Mexican model who represented her State in Nuestra Belleza México 1999.

Nuestra Belleza Mexico
Born in Sinaloa and raised in Los Mochis, Delgado competed against thirty-two other contestants for the national beauty title of Mexico, Nuestra Belleza México, held in Pachuca, Hidalgo on September, 1999.

Miss International 1999
Despite not winning her country's national title, she was chosen to represent Mexico in the 1999 Miss International pageant, held on 14 December 1999 at Tokyo's U-Port Hall, after winning the Miss Dorian Grey Title. But she resigned to the title. Much has been said that it was a nerve that Lynette remain as Suplente/1st Runner-up, being that she was considered the most beautiful of the 5 finalists to go to one of the two major pageants, so Lynette renounced the title and she was replaced by the 2nd Runner-up Graciela Soto.

References

Living people
People from Sinaloa
Nuestra Belleza México winners
Year of birth missing (living people)